This is a historic (index) list of United States Army weapons and materiel, by their Standard Nomenclature List (SNL) group and individual designations — an alpha-numeric nomenclature system used in the United States Army Ordnance Corps Supply Catalogues used from about 1930 to about 1958. The  explains that the "Index of Standard Nomenclature Lists (...) covers – by groups, and subdivisions of groups – all classes of equipment and supplies, assigned to the Ordnance Department for procurement, storage, issue, and maintenance."
The designations in this Wikipedia list represent so-called "major items". For each of the major items, there were separate, designated "Standard Nomenclature Lists" — extensive parts catalogs for supply and repair purposes. 

In essence, the index was a list of lists. There could be numerous volumes, changes, and updates under each single item designation.

According to the Corps' Ordnance Publications for Supply Index of July 1943:
Groups 'A' through 'N' covered "General Ordnance Supplies"; including
 group 'F' (Fire control, and sighting material), and
 group 'G' (Tank / Automotive materiel)
Groups 'P' through 'T' covered "Ammunition" – for which there was an additional AIC code
Group 'Z' was for "Captured Enemy Material", and
Group 'OGS' indicated "Obsolete General Supplies".
Group "Y", for 'Guided Missiles, guidance and control, launching, transporting, radio-controlled, and handling material, was added after July 1943

War Department Catalog

WD CAT. ORD 1 Introduction to Ordnance catalog
WD CAT. ORD 2 Index to Ordnance supply catalog
WD CAT. ORD 3 list of items for issue to troops, posts, camps, and stations.
WD CAT. ORD 4 Allowances of expendable supplies
WD CAT. ORD 5 Stock list of items
WD CAT. ORD 5-1 Numerical index of manufactures part numbers, and drawing numbers
WD CAT. ORD 6 Tools, and tool sets
WD CAT. ORD 7 Organizational Maintenance Allowances.
WD CAT. ORD 8 Field and Depot Maintenance Allowances.
WD CAT. ORD 9 List of all service parts.
WD CAT. ORD 10 tool load, and supply guide
WD CAT. ORD 11 Ammunition
WD CAT. ORD 12 Obsolete general supplies
WD CAT. ORD 13 Parts common to two or more major items
WD CAT. ORD 14-1 Interchangeability lists for tanks, and vehicles of related chassis.
WD CAT. ORD 14-2 Interchangeability list
Volume 1 Interchangeability list for ordnance, general purpose and combat vehicles (except full track vehicles) group 0-0800
Volume 2 Interchangeability list for ordnance, general purpose and combat vehicles (except full track vehicles) group 0900-2500
WD CAT. ORD 15-1 (Ordnance numbers) Cross reference list of ordnance part, and stock numbers (ten volumes)
WD CAT. ORD 15-2 (stock numbers) (ten volumes)
WD CAT. ORD 16 Captured Foreign Material

Group "A" Material
Automatic weapons, small mortars, carts, and light artillery
A1 Major items, and Major combinations of
A2 Cal. .50 machine gun Browning M1921 water cooled
A3 Material, antiaircraft, automatic gun - Parts and equipment
A4 Cal. .30 Browning Automatic Rifle M1918, and M1918A1
A5 Cal. .30 machine gun M1917A- (M1917 Browning machine gun)
A6 Cal. .30 machine gun M1919A- (M1919 Browning machine gun)
A7 37-mm gun carriage M1916A1, A2
A8 ammunition cart machine gun M1917
A9 37-mm ammunition cart M1917
A10 Items not authorized for general use
A11 Lewis aircraft machine gun, cal. .30 M1918, parts and equipment.
A12 Cal. .30 machine gun M1918 aircraft
A13 Cal. .30 machine gun M1918M1 aircraft
A14 Cal. .30 machine gun, Marlin, aircraft M1916
A15 Gun 37-mm, and tank cradle M1916
A16 2.24-inch tank gun (6LB)
A17 Hangers, pack, gun and ammunition - Parts and equipment
A18 Cal. .30 machine rifle M1922
A19 Parts Common for Group A Materiel
A20 Cal. .50 machine gun Browning M1921 aircraft
A21 cart mortar light, M1
A22 cart communications, telephone M1
A23 75-mm mortar M1, M2
A24 Cart (provisional) - Parts and equipment
Cart, communication, radio (provisional).
Cart, communication, telephone (provisional). 
Cart, mortar, light (provisional). 
A25 37-mm gun carriage M2
A26 cart M2
A27 Gun, subcaliber, M1 for 2.24" (6-Pdr.) tank gun, Mk. II (British)
A28 Cal. .30 fixed aircraft machine gun, M2 (M2 Browning machine gun)
A29 37-mm M1A2 on carriage M3A1 (37mm Gun M1)
A30 wheeled machine gun mount M1
A31
A32 Cal. .45 machine gun, M1928A1 (Thompson submachine gun)
A33 81-mm mortar M1 and M4
A34 3-inch trench mortar MK1
A35 Tool, Maintenance, for Repair of Group A Materiel" Dated 1 July 1945
A36 Cal. .50 aircraft machine gun basic, M2
A37 Cal. .50 water cooled machine gun, AA, M2
A38 Cal. .50 machine gun AN/M2 (aircraft)
A39 Cal. .50 machine gun heavy, aircraft fixed, M2
A40 Cal. .22 machine gun trainer M1
A41
A42 M3 and M3A4 hand cart, general utility
M3 and M3A4 hand cart, general utility.
M4 hand cart, M3 cart configured for transportation of .30-caliber M1917A1 Browning Machinegun.
M4A1 hand cart, M3A4 cart configured for transportation of .30-caliber M1917A1 Browning Machinegun.
M5 hand cart, M3 cart configured for transportation of .50-caliber M2 Browning Heavy Machinegun.
M5A1 hand cart, M3A4 cart configured for transportation of .50-caliber M2 Browning Heavy Machinegun. 
M6 hand cart, M3 cart configured for transportation of 81mm M1 Medium Mortar.
M6A1 hand cart, M3A4 cart configured for transportation of 81mm M1 Medium Mortar.
A43 60-mm mortar M2 and M19
A44 37-mm gun M3 on carriage M4 
A45 37-mm gun M6 on M23 mount (M3 Stuart)
A46 37-mm gun, automatic, M4 and M10
A47 20-mm gun, automatic, M1 and AN/M2 (Aircraft), AN/M3, and M24)
A48 subcaliber device
S1
S2
S3
S4 Rifle M2A1 .22 Cal.
S5 subcaliber device M5 Cal. .22 rifle
S6 Rifle M1903A2 .30 Cal
S7 Trainer machine gun Cal.22 M3 and M4
S8 Trainer machine gun Cal.30 T9
S9
S10 mortar, subcaliber, 60-mm, M28, M31
A49 Rifle, automatic, Cal. .30, Browning M1918A2
A50 40-mm automatic gun M1; on M2 carriage
A51 Unassigned (Mount, truck, pedestal, M24A1, now assigned SNL A-55)
A52 Cal. .45 submachine gun, M2
A53 20-mm gun automatic M1, AN/M2, AN/M3, and M24
A54 Mount, machine gun, twin, cal. 50, M33
A55 mounts small arms for motor vehicles.  (A55 contains at least 56 sections)
S1 Introduction and index
S2 3.5-inch Ball mount, M13
S3 mount bracket M20
S4 Left sponson mount and right sponson mount, parts and equipment. (M2 Light Tank)
S5 combination gun mount, M22
S6 combination gun mount, M23, M23A2
S7 mount machine gun, Cal. .30, M26
S8 mount bow gun, Cal. .30. M27
S9 combination gun mount, M24, and M2A1
S10 mount machine gun Cal. .50 (D59530) (M4 Sherman)
S11 Mount, ball, Cal. .30 (D51070) (M4 Sherman)
S12 37-mm gun mount, M25, and M26
S13 mount ball, (D59830)
S14 Cal. .30, MG mount, M29
S15 Cal. .50 MG mount, M30,
S16 mount truck pedestal, M24, and M24A1, (Dodge WC series)
S17 mount truck pedestal, M25
S18 mount truck pedestal, M31
S19 truck mounts, M32, M36, and M37
S20 mount machine gun, Cal. .30, T53
S21 mount pedestal, machine gun, M4
S22 combination gun mount, T55
S23 Mount, machine gun Cal. .30 (D40771)
S24 combination gun mount M44
S25 Mount, machine gun, Cal. .30 (E6160)
S26 Mount Machine gun, Twin, Cal. .50 (T-52) (M6 heavy tank)
S27 Ring mount, M41 for Cal. .30 MG
S28 Cal. .30, or .50 MG mount, M35, and M35C
S29 mount machine gun, AA, Cal. .50. (D60258)
S30 mount, machine gun Cal. .50, (D69820)
S31 mount bracket, M40
S32 Cal. .30 MG mount, M48
S33 Mount, pedestal, machine gun, cal. .50, M39, mount, pedestal, machine gun, cal. .50, M43, and mount, pedestal, machine gun, twin, cal. .50, M46, organizational spare parts and equipment.
S34 Cal. .30 MG mount (D78272)
S35 Mount, antiaircraft gun Cal. .30 (D60490)
S36 Mount, flexible bow gun. (D71797)
S37 Mount, machine gun, A A, cal. .30 (D41488)
S38 Mount, machine gun, A A, cal. .50 (D80030)
S39 Mount, Bow gun, Cal. .30 (D97194)
S40 Mount, machine gun, A A, cal. .50 (D70627)
S41 Mount, flexible bow gun. (D67194)
S42 Cal. .30 MG, ball mount
S43 Mount machine gun AA, Cal. .50?
S44 Mount, ring, M66
S45 Mount Pedestal Machine Gun (7115438) 1956
S46 Mount, Machine Gun, Cal. .30 (D76459)(M24 Chaffee)
S47 Mount ball Cal.30 (7058104)
S48
S49
S50 Ring mount, M49, M49A1, M49A1C, and Mount truck, M32, M36, M37, M50, M56, M58, M59, M60, M61.
S51 Mount truck M57
S52 Mount truck M58
S53 Mount truck M59
S54 Mount truck M60
S55 Mount truck M61
S56 Mount ring, M68
A56 trainer machine gun M9
A57 37mm gun automatic, AN/M9
A58 Cal. .45 submachine gun M3 (grease gun), (M3 submachine gun)
A59 Cal. .50 machine gun heavy, turret type, M2
A60 Cart, utility, light weight.
A61 Quadmount M55
A62 2-Inch Mortar M3
A63
A64 Gun machine. Cal. .60 T17E3
A65
A66
A67 Gun, machine, Cal. .50, AN-M3 aircraft basic.
A68
A69 Cart, hand, M7, and M9
A70 Mortar, 4.2-inch, M2
A71 Machine, Linking, Powered. Cal. .50. M5. and Delinker, M7
A72 Sled Artillery M2 M2C M3 M4 M5 M6 M7 M8 M9 M10 M10C and M12 Ski Snow M13 1950
A73 Gun, Automatic, 20-mm, M24, M24A1, M24E2 Repositioner 20-mm M17 1955
A74 Mount Ball, Cal. .30 (7722940)
A75 Mount, machine gun, Cal. .30 or Cal. .50 (7069694)
A76 Mount, and shield, Machine gun, Cal. .30 (7326774)
A77 .50 Cal. subcaliber mount M19
A78 Mount, ball, Cal. .30 (7722408)
A79 Machine Repositioning Cal .50 M15 1950
A80 Mount machine gun, Cal. .50, M69.
A81 Mount machine gun, Cal. .30, M70.
A82 Mortar 81-MM, M29/M23 /w baseplate M23A1,A2,A3 Parts /Jul 1956 (M29 mortar)
A83 Linker, powered. 20-mm, M16, (T-27)
A84 Mount twin, machine gun, T122
A85 Mortar, 4.2-inch, M30, T104
A86 Mount tripod weapon, M74, (T113E2)
A87
A88. 50 machine gun mount AA
A89 Cal. .30 Machine gun, M37, (Patton series Tanks)
A90 .30 cal. machine gun mount
A91 Gun, automatic, Cal. .60, T130E3,E4, M38
Gun, automatic, 20-mm, T160E3, M39, M39A1 M39 cannon
A92 Cradle, pintle, and ammunition box tray, machine gun, Cal. .30 or Cal. .50 (E10014)
A93 Mount machine gun, AA, Cal. .50
A94 Machine, repositioning, 20-mm, M17
A95 Gun automatic, 30-mm, T121, T182.
A96 Mount, Ring, Machine gun, Cal. .50, M81
A97 Mount, ring, machine gun, Cal. .50, (8691154)
A98 Mount, Commander's Cupola & Cal. .50 AA Machine Gun (8797700) & (8704789)
A99
A100

Group "B" Material
Revolvers, pistols, shotguns, arms chests, rocket launchers
B1 Major items of group B material
B2
B3 U.S. Rifle, M1903 rifle, Cal. .30 M1903 Springfield
B4 U.S. Rifle, Cal. .30, M1917 (Enfield) M1917 Enfield
B5 Gallery practice rifle, cal. .22 M1903
B6 Pistol, Automatic, Cal. .45, M1911 and M1911A1
B7 Pistol, Revolver, Cal. .45, M1917 (M1917 revolver)
B8 Bayonet, M1905, M1917 and M1; Bayo-Knife, M4 (M1 bayonet)
B9 Shotguns 12 gauge
B10 Rifle, U.S., cal. .30 M1903, Mk.I (special) - Parts and equipment
B11 Items not authorized for general use
B12 Very pistol, 25 mm, MK 4, parts and equipment.
B13 Helmet steel, M1917A1, M1917. (Brodie helmet)
B14 Tools for reloading small arms ammunition, parts and equipment.
B15 Items common to 2 or more Group B products.
B16 List of all Parts of Arms Locker, Arm Rack, Arm Repair Chest, and Pistol Cleaning Kit
B17 Rifle, U.S., cal. .22 M1922, M1, and M2
B18 Pistol, Pyrotechnic, M2
B19 Pyrotechnic projector, ground M1A1
B20 Tools, Maintenance For Repair Of Group B Materiel (Handguns, Small Arms, and Pyrotechnic Projectors)
B21 Rifle, U.S., cal. .30 M1, M1C, M1D (Sniper's) (M1 Garand)
B22 Interchangeability chart
B23 Pistol, Very, 10-gauge, Mk. III and M5
B24 Projector, signal, ground, M3 and M4
B25 Rifle Cal. .22 commercial type (Remington Rifle Cal. .22 M513T, Stevens Rifle Cal. .22 M416-2, Winchester Rifle Cal. .22 M75)
B26
B27
B28 Carbine cal..30 M1, M1A1, M2 AND M3 (M1 carbine)
B29 Cal22, Ruger. Mark I, Target Model. Revolver, Colt, Cal38, Special, Detective Special, 2-Inch Barrel; Revolver, (Colt Detective Special)
B30 Pistol, Colt, Cal. .22, Ace.
B31 pistol, automatic .22 Colt, Woodsman, match target, and standard.
B32 Pistol, Automatic .22 High Standard Model B and HD 1944 (High Standard .22 Pistol)
B33 Pistol, pyrotechnic, with Mount, AN-M8
B34 Discharger, pyrotechnic, AN-M5
B35 Pistol, Automatic, Cal. .32. 380,Colt
B36 M1 rocket launcher (Bazooka)
M1 rocket launcher
M1A1 rocket launcher
B37 M3 Trench knife (M3 Fighting Knife)
B38 Projector, pyrotechnic, hand, M9
B39 Launcher, grenade, M1 and M2, M7 and M8 M7 grenade launcher
B40 Projector, signal, ground, M1A1
B41 M9 rocket launcher (Bazooka)
M9 rocket launcher
M9A1 rocket launcher
M18 rocket launcher 
B42 M20, M20B1, rocket launcher (Bazooka)
B43 Rifle, Survival, cal..22, M4 (T38) (Hornet) (M4 Survival Rifle)
B44 Launcher Rocket, Repeating, 3.5-inch, M25, (T115E1). and tripod M77
B45 Rifle / Shotgun- Cal. .22/.410 gauge. M6 survival  (M6 Aircrew Survival Weapon)
B46 Pistol marine, signal, 37-mm, (7162921)
B47 Revolver, lightweight, Cal. .38 special, M12, and M13 (Smith & Wesson Model 12).
B48 Rifle spotting, Cal. .50, M8 (for M40 recoilless rifle)
B49 Pistol, Automatic, Cal. .22, High Standard, Supermatic; Pistol, Automatic,
B50 Rifle, Cal30-06, Winchester, Model 70, Special Match Grade; Rifle, Cal.
B51
B52
B53
B54
B55
B56
B57
B58
B59
B60

Group "C" Material
Pack, light, and medium field artillery as well as limbers and caissons

C1 Major items of Pack, Light, and medium field artillery, and armament of these calibers for airplane and combat vehicles
C2 Carriage, M1916 for 75 mm gun M1916 (wooden wheel)

C3 carriage, M1918, for Howitzer 155-mm, M1918, (wooden wheel) (Canon de 155 C modèle 1917 Schneider)
C4 Gun and carriage, 75-mm, M1897MI, and M1897MIA2 (wooden wheel) (Canon de 75 modèle 1897)
C5 Caisson, 75-mm gun, M1918. limber caisson
C6 Items common to 2 or more Group C materiel.
C7 Limber and caisson, for 155-mm howitzer, M1917, M1918 (Canon de 155 C modèle 1917 Schneider)
C8 Wagon, battery and store, M1917; Limber, forge, M1902MI; Limber, store, M1902MI - Parts and equipment, Feb. 25, 1925
C9 Carriage, M1917 for 75-mm (British) (wooden wheel)(75 mm gun M1917)
C10 Cart, battery, reel, M1917A2
C11 Cart, artillery, reel, M1909M1, M1918
C12 Gun 75-mm, M1897A2, and M1897A4, on Carriage M2A3 (Canon de 75 modèle 1897)
C13 Reloading and cleaning outfits, parts.
C14 Subcaliber and drill cartridge kits, parts.
C15 Items not authorized for general use.
C16 Gun and Carriage, mountain, 2.95" - Parts and equipment, including pack equipment. (QF 2.95 inch Mountain Gun)
C17 carriage M1917, for 155-mm, howitzer M1917, (wooden wheel)
C18 Tools, Maintenance, for repair of pack, light and medium field artillery; and armament of these calibers for airplane and combat vehicles
C19
C20 Howitzer pack, 75-mm M1A1. on Carriage M8 (75 mm Pack Howitzer M1)
C21 Howitzer, 105-mm M2A1. on mount M4, and M4A1. (M101 howitzer)
C22 Parts and accessories for 3" materiel (except guns and carriage); 4.7" materiel; 60 Pdr. materiel (3-inch M1902 field gun, 4.7 inch Gun M1906, BL 60-pounder gun)
C23 Materiel, howitzer, 105mm (German) - Parts and equipment (10.5 cm leFH 16)
C24 Guns, 3", M1902, M1904, M1905 and Carriage, M1902 -Parts and equipment (3-inch M1902 field gun)
C25 Gun and carriage, 75-mm, M1897A4 (high speed)
C26 Howitzer, pack, M1, and M1A1. on Carriage M3A3 
C27 Carriage Gun, 75-mm, M1917A1 (high speed) (75 mm gun M1917)
C28 Howitzer, 155-mm, M1918. on Carriage M1918A3 (high speed)
C29 Limber, light, M2, and Caisson, light, M1.
C30 Carriage M1916A1 for 75-mm gun, (high speed) (75 mm gun M1916)
C31 Howitzer, 155-mm, M1917A2, and carriage M1917A4
C32
C33 Subcaliber mounts? (at least 18 sections)
S1
S2
S3
S4
S5 Mount Subcaliber, 37mm, M5
S6
S7 Mount subcaliber, 37mm, M13A1
S8
S9 Mount subcaliber M14 (for 57mm)(Can take .22 or .30 Rifle)
S10
S11 Mount subcaliber, Cal .50, M10
S12
S13 Gun 37mm, M1916 
S14
S15 Gun Subcaliber, 37mm, M12. (for 75mm pack)
S16 Gun Subcaliber M13 (for 105mm Howitzer)
S17 Gun Subcaliber M15 (for 76mm Gun)
S18 Cartridge Training Subcaliber, 75-mm, M34
S19 Cartridge Training Subcaliber, 57-mm, T12E1
C34 Gun, 75-mm, M2 and M3 (tank) and mount gun 75-mm, M1. (75 mm gun M2/M3/M6), (M4 Sherman)
C35
C36 Gun, 57-mm, M1 on Carriage, M1A2 (Ordnance QF 6 pounder)
C37
C38 Gun, 4.5-inch, M1. on Carriage M1A1 (4.5 inch Gun M1)
C39 Howitzer, 155-mm, M1. on mount M14 (M114 155 mm howitzer)
C40 Gun, 3-inch, M5. on Carriage M1. (3 inch Gun M5)
C41 Gun, 57-mm, M1. recoil mechanism, M12, and mount T5
C42
C43 Gun 3-inch, M7. on mount M5. (M10 tank destroyer)
C44 Gun, 75-mm, M3. on mount M34, and M34A1
C45 Howitzer, 105-mm M2A1. on mount M4 (105 mm Howitzer M2)
C46 Gun, 76-mm, M1, and M1A1 (tank) and mount gun combination, M34A1 (76 mm gun M1)
C47 Gun, 75-mm, M4. on airplane mount M6
C48 Gun, 75-mm, M1897A4. on mount M3
C49 Gun, 75-mm, M1897A4. on mount M5
C50 Howitzer, 105-mm, M3. on Carriages M3, and M3A1
C51 Howitzer, 75-mm, M3. on mount M7 and M12
C52 Gun, 75-mm, M3. and mount combination M47
C53 Gun, 3-inch, M7, and mount combination T49
C54 Howitzer, pack, 75-mm, M1A1. on Carriage M8
C55
C56 Stabilizers all types
C57 Howitzer, 75-mm, M1A1. on mount T10
C58 Gun, 76-mm, M1A1C, and M1A2. on mount M1
C59 Trailer ammunition, M10
C60 Gun, 75-mm, T13E1. on Aircraft mount T13E2, (AN-M9 Mount), (AN-M5A1 Gun)
C61 Gun, 75-mm, M10. on aircraft mount M10
C62 Howitzer, 105-mm, M2A1. and mount howitzer M3
C63 Howitzer, 105-mm, M4. on mount M5 (tank-mounted version)
C64 Gun, 76-mm, M1A1C, and M1A1. on mount M62
C65
C66 Gun, 75-mm, M6. on mount M17, and M64
C67 M23 Rocket Launcher
C68
C69 Gun, 90-mm, M3. on mount M67 (90 mm Gun M1/M2/M3)
C70
C71
C72
C73 Recoilless Rifle, 57-mm T-15E3, and M18 (M18 recoilless rifle)
C74 Recoilless Rifle, 75-mm T-21, and M20 (M20 recoilless rifle)
C75
C76 Mount Howitzer, 105-mm, M5.
C77 Rifle, 105-MM, M27A1; Mount, Rifle, 105-MM, M75, and 75A1
C78
C79
C80
C81 Launcher, rocket, multiple, 7.2-inch, M24.
C82 Gun, 76-mm, M32 (T91E3); and Mount, Combination Gun, M76 (T138E1) and M76A1 (T138E2)
C83 Mount, Howitzer, 75-mm, M12.
C84 Gun, 76-mm, M48, T124E2, and carriage,M29
C85 Launch, rocket, multiple, 4.5-inch, T106E1
C86 Cannon, Howitzer, 105-mm, M-49 (T96E1); Mount, Howitzer, 105-mm, M-85 (T67E1)
C87 Launcher, rocket, 6.5-inch, T117.
C88 Gun, 3-inch,T98, and mount combination, T136
C89 Howitzer, 105-mm, T79. and carriage, T55.
C90 Launcher, Rocket, Multiple, 4.5-Inch, M21 (T123)
C91 Mount, Tripod 75-mm, rifle, M1917A2:
C92 Howitzer, 110-mm, T142, T143. and carriage T74.
C93 Rifle, 106-MM, M40; Mount, 106-MM Rifle, M79 M40 recoilless rifle
C94
C95
C96
C97
C98
C99
C100

Group "D" Material
 Heavy field artillery
D1 Major items of heavy field artillery
D2 Major items of antiaircraft artillery
D3 Materiel, howitzer, 8" - Parts and equipment (BL 8 inch Howitzer Mk VI – VIII)
D4 Material, Howitzer, 240-mm, M1918A2. (M1918 240 mm howitzer)
D5 3-inch Stokes trench mortar, Mk. 1 (Stokes Mortar)  
D6 Mortar, trench, 6" - Parts and equipment (Newton 6 inch Mortar)
D7 Mount, truck, antiaircraft, M1917, for 75mm gun, M1916 - Parts and equipment (75 mm gun M1916) 

D8 Gun, antiaircraft, 3-inch, M1917, M1917M1, M1917M2, gun, antiaircraft, 3 inch, M1918, M1918M1, parts and equipment. (3-inch gun M1917, 3-inch gun M1918)
D9 Material, 3-inch, antiaircraft gun, M1917 (fixed) 
D10 3-inch, antiaircraft gun mount, M1918, 3-ton, antiaircraft gun trailer, M1918
D11 Gun, and carriage 155-mm, M1917, M1918, M2, M3. (155 mm gun M1918)
D12 Items common to 2 or more Group D materiel.
D13 Items not authorized for general use
D14 Tools for maintenance of antiaircraft artillery, heavy artillery
D15
D16 Material, 3-inch, antiaircraft gun, M3 (fixed) (3-inch anti-aircraft gun M3)
D17 Material, 3-inch, antiaircraft gun M1A1, and M1A2 (mobile) 
D18 Gun, antiaircraft, 105-mm, M3. and mount M1
D19 Gun, 155-mm, M1917 parts and equipment 
D20 Materiel, gun 6", Mk. XIX (British) - Parts and equipment (BL 6 inch Gun Mk XIX)
D21 Materiel, gun, 7", Navy, for caterpillar mount - Parts and equipment  also  (7"/44 caliber gun)
D22 Trailer, 3-ton, for 240mm howitzer M1918 - Parts and equipment
D23 Material, 3-inch, antiaircraft gun, M2A2 (mobile)
D24 Gun, 155-mm, M1, and M1A1. on Carriage M1. (155 mm Long Tom)
D25 Gun, 155-mm, M1918, parts and material
D26 Gun, 155-mm M1917A1, parts and equipment
D27
D28 Gun, 90-mm, M1, and M1A1. on mounts M1, and M1A1 (90 mm Gun M1/M2/M3)
D29 Howitzer, 8-inch, M2. on Carriage M1. (M115 howitzer)
D30 Gun, 155-mm, M1918MI. on Carriage M3
D31 Howitzer, 240-mm, M1. on Carriage M1 (240 mm howitzer M1)
D32 Gun, 120-mm, M1. on mount M1 120 mm M1 gun
D33 Gun 8-inch, M1. on Carriage M2 (8 inch Gun M1)
D34 Gun 90-mm, M1. and mount gun antiaircraft T2E1
D35 Howitzer, 240-mm, M1918MI, and M1918MIA1. on Carriage M1918A2
D36 Gun, 155-mm, M1918MI. on mount M4
D37 Gun, 90-mm, M1. on mount M3 (90 mm Gun M1/M2/M3)
D38 Gun, 90-mm, M2. on AA mount M2
D39 Gun, 90-mm, M3. on mount M67
D40 Gun, 90-mm, T8. on Carriage T5E2
D41 Subcaliber device
S1
S2 Mount Subcaliber M10, (for 37mm)
S3
S4
S5 mount subcaliber, Cal. .50 T-21
S6 Gun, 75-mm, M25, Subcaliber device.
S7 Mount subcaliber, Cal. .50, M17
D42 Gun, subcaliber, 37-mm, M14
D43
D44
D45
D46 Exerciser, recoil mechanism, M1
D47 Mount,gun, combination, M73. for M46 & M46A1 tanks (M46 Patton)
D48 Gun automatic, 75-mm T83E6, and E7. recoil mechanism, and loader ramer. (Skysweeper)
D49 service parts, gun 155-mm, T80, (M46), howitzer 8-inch, T89, and mounts
D50 Mount, howitzer, 155-mm, M80. (T167), 
D51 Howitzer 8-inch, T89 (M47)
D52 Gun, 90-mm, M36, (T119E1). (M47 Patton)
D53 Gun, 120-mm, T123E1, combination mount T154
D54 Mount, gun, combination, M78, 90-mm.
D55 Gun, 90-mm, T133, and carriage,T71
D56 Gun, 165-mm, T156, (formerly gun demolition, 6.5-inch, British Mk. I.) (M728 Combat Engineer Vehicle)
D57 Gun, 280-mm, T131, and carriage T72. (M65 Atomic Cannon)
D58 Gun, 90-mm, M41, T139 (M48 Patton)
D59 Gun, 90-mm, T125
D60 Mount Gun combination, T148
D61 Mount Gun combination, (7964488)
D62 Mount Gun combination, T139
D63 Howitzer, 155-mm, M45, T186E1. (M44 Self Propelled Howitzer)
D64 Gun, 175-mm, T145 
D65 launcher, rocket, 762-mm, truck mounted, M289, Honest John, Launcher, rocket, self-propelled, T135
D66 Trailer, 762-mm rocket, M329, and heating and tiedown kit M46. (Honest John)
D67 Gun 175-mm, T181.
D68 Mount 175-mm, T158
D69
D70

Group "E" Material
 Artillery on barbette and railway carriages
E1 Major items of railway and permanent and semi-permanent artillery
E2 Gun, 3-inch, M1903. Barbette Carriage M1903, (3-inch gun M1903)
E3 Guns, 5" - All models - Parts and equipment (5-inch gun M1900)
E4 Gun, 6-inch, M1900. on Barbette Carriage M1900, (6-inch gun M1900)
E5 Guns, 7" - All models - Parts and equipment (7"/44 caliber gun)
E6 Gun, 8-inch, M1888MIA1. on Barbette Carriage M1918 on railway Carriage M1918MI (8-inch M1888)
E7 Guns, 10" - all models - Parts and equipment. (10-inch gun M1895)
E8 Gun, 12-inch, M1895MIA2. on Barbette Carriage M1917. (12-inch gun M1895)
E9 Gun, 14-inch, M1920MII, MK. IV MI. and M1920MI. on Railway mount M1920. (14-inch M1920 railway gun)
E10 Gun, 16-inch, M1919MII, and M1919MIII. on Barbette Carriage M1919 (16-inch gun M1919)
E11 Gun and mount, saluting, 3", W.T. - Parts and equipment (3-inch Ordnance rifle)
E12 Howitzer, 16", M1920 - Parts and equipment (16-inch howitzer M1920)
E13 Mortars, 12" - All models, Parts and equipment (12-inch coast defense mortar)
E14 Carriage, altered gun lift - Parts and equipment 
E15 Gun, 3-inch, M1903. Barbette Carriage M1903
E16 Gun, 6-inch, M1900. on Barbette Carriage M1900
E17 Gun, 8-inch, M1888MIA1. on Barbette Carriage M1918 on railway Carriage M1918MI
E18 Carriages, barbette, 10" -all models - Parts and equipment
E19 Gun, 12-inch, M1895MIA2. on Barbette Carriage M1917
E20 Gun, 16-inch MK.II, M1. on Barbette Carriages M1919M1, M2, and M3 (16"/50 caliber Mark 2 gun)
E21 Carriages, disappearing, 6" - all models - Parts and equipment (disappearing gun)
E22 Carriages, disappearing, 8" L.F. - all models 
E23 Carriages, disappearing, 10", A.R.F. - all models - Parts and equipment
E24 Carriages, disappearing, 10", L.F. - all models - Parts and equipment
E25 Carriages, disappearing, 12", L.F. - all models - Parts and equipment
E26 Carriages, disappearing, 14", L.F. - all models - Parts and equipment (14-inch gun M1910)
E27 Carriages, disappearing, 16", L.F. - all models - Parts and equipment (16-inch gun M1895, 16-inch gun M1919)
E28 Howitzer 16-inch, M1920. on Barbette Carriage M1920 
E29 Carriages, mortar, 12" - all models - Parts and equipment
E30 Mount, pedestal, gun, 75mm, M1 - all models - Parts and equipment 75 mm gun M1916
E31 Mount, railway, 7", Mk.II Mod. 3, Navy - Parts and equipment 
E32 Mount, railway, 12", M1918 - Parts and equipment
E33 Gun, 14-inch, M1920MII, MK. IV MI. and M1920MI. on Railway mount M1920
E34 Gun, 8-inch, MK. VI MOD. 3A2. Railway mount M1A1. (8 inch Mk. VI railway gun)
E35 Mount, railway, sliding, 12" M1918 - Parts and equipment
E36 Mounts, railway, 14" Navy - all models - Parts and equipment (14"/50 caliber railway gun)
E37 Turret, 14", M1909 - Parts and equipment (Fort Drum (El Fraile Island), 14-inch gun M1909)
E38 Cars, ammunition - all types - Parts and equipment
E39 Car, construction, 14" Navy - Parts and equipment
E40 Car, crane, 14" Navy - Parts and equipment
E41 Cars, fire control - all models - Parts and equipment
E42 Car, ground platform, M1918 (for 12" gun railway mount, M1918 - Parts and equipment)
E43
E44 Cars, railway - all models - Parts and equipment
E45 Car, repair, M1918 - Parts and equipment
E46 Car, sand and log, 14" Navy - Parts and equipment
E47 Cars, shell and gun transport, narrow gauge - all types - Parts and equipment
E48
E49
E50 Items common to 2 or more Group E materiel
E51 subcaliber Devices
S1
S2
S3
S4
S5
S6 Gun subcaliber, 75-mm, M12, 75 mm gun M1916
E52 Items not authorized for general issue
E53 Car, Railway Machine shop, M1
E54 Gun, 6-inch, M1903A2, and M1905A2. On Carriage Barbette, M1, and M2 6-inch gun M1903
E55 Gun 8-inch, MK. VI, MOD. 3A2. on Barbette Carriage M1 8-inch Mk. VI railway gun
E56
E57 Organizational equipment, spare parts, tools, accessories, and supplies for controlled submarine mine materiel.
E58 Gun, 16-inch, MK. II M1. on Barbette Carriages M4, and M5
E59 Gun, 6-inch T2. on Barbette Carriages M3, and M4 6-inch gun M1
E60
E61 Power plant, M1 (for 16-inch gun batteries)
E62 Power plant, M2 (for 12-inch gun batteries)
E63 Power plant, M3 (for 8-inch gun batteries)
E64 power plant, M4 (for 6-inch gun batteries)
E65
E66 Combined list of all parts and organizational, and base maintenance spare parts and equipment for release buoy M2, (controlled submarine mine material)

Group "F" Material
Fire control, and sighting material
See: List of U.S. Army fire control and sighting material by supply catalog designation

Group "G" Material
 Tank and automotive.
See: List of U.S. military vehicles by supply catalog designation

Group "H" Material
 Hardware
H1 Standard Hardware
H2 Miscellaneous hardware
H3 Straps, leather findings, and piece leather. 
H4 Electrical fittings
H5 Electrical Piece Material
H6 Pipe and Hose Fittings
H7 Pipe, Tubing, and Hose
H8 Chains, locks, hasps, hinges.
H9 Miscellaneous Piece Material (wire, rope, thread, duck, glass, etc.)
H10 Ferrous Metals
H11 Nonferrous Metals
H12 Antifriction bearings, and related items
H13 Oil Seals
H14 Tires, Tubes, Tire Repair Material, and Related Items
H15 Batteries
H16 Lubricating Fittings, Oil Filters, and Oil Filter Elements
H17 Brake Lining Kits, Curtains, Paulins, "V" Belts, and Miscellaneous Material
H18
H19
H20 Miscellaneous Hardware, Wiring, and Assembling Kits

Group "I" Material
Unknown or unused

Group "J" Material
 Common tools
J1 Abrasion, and compression tools. (general abrasives, hand grinders, hand presses, sharpening stones, etc.)
J2 Cutting, boring, and tweezer tools. (saws, shears, planes, files, rasps, chisels, bits, reamers (hand), pliers, pincers, etc.)
J3 Geometrical tools and instruments.
J4 Punch, drift, fastening, and scraping tools. (awls, needles, punches, drifts, screwdrivers, wrenches, scrapers, riveters, (hand sets), etc.)
J5 lifting, holding, forming tools. (bit braces, saw frames, vises, clamps, hoists, block and tackle, molds for castings, anvils, jacks, and slings.)
J6 Percussion, digging, and wrecking tools. (hammers, mallets, mauls, sledges, axes, hatchets, picks, mattocks, shovels, crowbars, pinch bars, etc.)
J7 Welding, forging, soldering, and brazing equipment. (blow-torches, soldering coppers, melting ladles, and welding outfits).
J8 Hand tool appurtenances. (file cleaners, handles, heads, tool checks, tool racks, etc.)
J9 Measuring, and testing instruments. (electrical, air, liquid, etc.)
J10 Small tools. (twist drills, countersinks, counterbores, cutting-off tool cutters, cutters etc.),(at least 9 sections)
J11 Ammunition renovating tools.
J12 Tools, Maintenance, for repair of group B materiel
J13 Special tool sets for field artillery, and combat vehicle weapons
J14 Paint, spraying equipment, and related items.
J15 Benches, tool boxes, cabinets, bins, tool chests, tool rolls, etc. of general application.
J16 Tire repair, and maintenance tools, and equipment. (J-16 contains at least 65 sections)
J17 Common hand tools
J18 special tools for special weapons
J19 special tools for guided missiles
J20 miscellaneous kits, and tool sets
J21 Tool Set, Special, Explosive Ordnance Disposal Squad
J22 special tools for sighting and fire control material, used with small?
J23 special cannon bore inspection equipment
J24 special tools for large caliber free flight rocket material. (group D)
J25 tool set special, organizational maintenance, missile repair, Corporal XSSM-A-17.
J26
J27
J28 Special Tool Sets, for special weapons,(group D)
J29 Special Tool Sets, for guided missiles (group Y)
S1. Special Tool Sets, for Corporal guided missile materiel
S2. Special Tool Sets, for Nike guided missile materiel
J30
J31
J32 Special Tool Sets for Sighting & Fire Control Materiel Used with Small Arms, Automatic Guns, Mortars, & Field Artillery
J33 Tool Set, Field, Special, Ordnance Ballistic & Technical Service Team & Cannon Bore Inspection Equipment
J34 Special Tool Sets for Large Caliber Free Flight Rocket Materiel
(NOTE- after J-34 tools are listed individually, and number into the 700's)

Group "K" Material
  Fluids, Gases, expendables
K1 Cleaning, preserving, and lubricating materials, recoil fluids, special oils, and similar items of issue. (Paint included).
K2 Soldering, brazing and welding materials, gases, and related items.
K3 Lubricating equipment, accessories and related dispensers.
K4 Oil filter elements

Group "L" Material
 Target material
L1 Targets, and Target equipment. small arms.
L2 Major items of Group L.
L3 Targets and target material, fixed armament, parts and equipment.
L4 M3 field artillery trainer, (fires 1-inch steel balls. via compressed air).
L5 Skeet and trap shooting equipment
L6 discharger, smoke puff, parts and equipment
L7
L8
L9 Target, fast moving ground, M2, parts and equipment.
L10 projector target, rocket, M1
L11
L12 Board terrain, M1
L13 Kit Training, Gunnery, M36.
L14 target seacoast, M18
L15 Target tow, Mk.22 A6B, and A7

Group "M" Material
Electrical apparatus and Miscellaneous 
M1 Electrical apparatus units and parts
M2 Unassigned (1944 ORD2)
M3 Miscellaneous accessory units and parts
M4 Unassigned (1944 ORD2)
M5 Component parts common to two or more groups.
M6 Unassigned (1944 ORD2)
M7 Unassigned (1944 ORD2)
M8 Miscellaneous Chests, Kits, Racks, and tool rolls, cleaning materials, and small stores. (without contents)
M9 Miscellaneous ordnance motor vehicle units and parts.
M10 Unassigned (1944 ORD2)

Group "N" Material
 Tool sets
N1 Maneuvering material and supplies.
N2
N3
N4
N5
N6
N7 Ordnance medium tank company.
N8 Tools and supplies for ordnance light maintenance company.
N9 Measuring, impression, testing, and reconditioning outfits.
N10 Surveillance, demolition, testing, equipment.
N11 General tools and supplies, ordnance depot company
N12 General tools and supplies, ordnance ammunition company
N13
N14
N16
N17 General tools, and supplies, for ordnance ammunition company.
N18 Tool set, armorers, tank destroyer battalion.
N19 Tool sets, motor transport Basic.
N20 Tool set Armorers, field artillery Battalion.
N21 Ordnance maintenance sets.
N22
N23 Tool-set, unit equipment, special for posts camps, and stations.
N24
N25
N30 Tool-sets, for ordnance service command automotive shops.

Group "O" Material
Unknown or unused

Group "P" Material
 Ammunition for heavy artillery
P1 Projectiles, separate loading, 6-inch to 240-mm inclusive
P2 Charges, propelling, separate loading, 6-inch to 240-mm inclusive for harbor defense, heavy field, and railway artillery.
P3 Projectiles, separate loading, 10-inch to 16-inch inclusive, for harbor defense, heavy field, and railway artillery. including complete round data.
P4 Charges, propelling, separate loading, 10-inch to 16-inch inclusive, for harbor defense, heavy field, and railway artillery.
P5 Ammunition for antiaircraft artillery
P6 Ammunition, fixed, including subcaliber ammunition, for harbor defense, heavy field, and railway artillery
P7 Fuzes, Primers, Blank ammunition, and miscellaneous items for antiaircraft, harbor defense, heavy field, and railway artillery
P8 Ammunition instruction material, for antiaircraft, harbor defense, heavy field, and railway artillery
P9 Ammunition, obsolete and nonstandard for harbor defense, heavy field and railway artillery.
P10 Packing materials used by field service for antiaircraft, harbor defense, heavy field, and railway artillery service ammunition
P11 Special Ammunition Surveillance, Testing, Inspection, and Renovation: Tools and Supplies

Group "Q" Material
 Special weapons material
Q1 Major items and major combinations of

Group "R" Material
 Ammunition for pack, light, and medium field artillery
R1 Ammunition, fixed and semifixed, all types, including subcaliber for pack, light, and medium field artillery including complete round
R2 Projectiles, and propelling charges, separate loading, for medium field artillery including complete round data.
R3 Service fuzes and primers for pack, light, and medium field artillery
R4 Ammunition, trench mortar, including fuzes, propelling charges and other components
R5 Ammunition, blank, for Pack, Light, and Medium field artillery
R6 Ammunition instruction material for pack, light, and medium field artillery
R7 Land Mines and Fuzes, Demolition Material, and Ammunition for Simulated Artillery and Grenade Fire
R8 Ammunition complete and nonstandard
R9
R10 Packing materials used by field service

Group "S" Material
 Bombs, grenades, pyrotechnics
S1 Bombs, aircraft, all types
S2 Fuzes and miscellaneous explosive components for aircraft bombs
S3 Fin assemblies, and miscellaneous inert components for aircraft bombs
S4 Grenades, hand and rifle, and fuzing components
S5 Pyrotechnics, military, all types
S6 Ammunition instruction material for grenades, pyrotechnics, and aircraft bombs
S7 Guided missile complete rounds, all types
S8 Guided missile explosive components, all types
S9 Rockets, all types, and components
S10 Obsolete and nonstandard bombs, grenades, pyrotechnics, and rockets.
S11 Materials for renovating and packaging of Group S ammunition and miscellaneous items

Group "T" Material
 Small arms ammunition
T1 Ammunition for Rifle, Carbine, and Automatic gun.
T2 Ammunition for revolver, automatic pistol, and submachine gun.
T3 Shells for shotgun
T4 Miscellaneous service components of small arms ammunition, and instruction material for field service account.
T5 Shipping and packaging containers and materials, including such items as Bandoleers, Belts, Clips, Links, and odds and ends for small arms ammunition.
T6 Ammunition, small arms, obsolete and nonstandard.

Group "U" Material
 Army Aircraft
U1 Major items of
U2 Aircraft, 2 place, fixed wing L-19A (Cessna), Cessna O-1 Bird Dog
U3 Aircraft, 2 place, fixed wing L-21A (Piper), Piper PA-18 Super Cub
U4 Aircraft, multi passenger, fixed wing L-17A,-B,-C, (Ryan), Ryan Navion
U5 Aircraft, multi passenger, fixed wing L-20 (DeHaviland), de Havilland Canada DHC-2 Beaver
U6 Aircraft, multi passenger, fixed wing LC-126B (Cessna)
U7 Aircraft, helicopter, utility, H-13B, C, D, E, (Bell), Bell H-13 Sioux
U8 Aircraft, helicopter, utility, H-23, B, (Hiller), Hiller OH-23 Raven
U9 Aircraft, helicopter, cargo transport, H-19A, B, (Sikorsky), Sikorsky H-19 Chickasaw
U10 Aircraft, helicopter, cargo transport H-21B, (Piasecki), Piasecki H-21
U11 Aircraft, helicopter, cargo transport H-25A, (Piasecki), Piasecki HUP Retriever
U12 Aircraft, multi passenger, twin engine, multi passenger, L-23, Beechcraft L-23 Seminole
U13 Aircraft, target, OQ-19D

Group "V" Material
 (unused or unknown)

Group "W" Material
 (unused or unknown)

Group "X" Material
 (unused or unknown)

Group "Y" Material
 Guided Missiles, guidance and control, launching, transporting, and handling material. (as well as radio-controlled aerial targets)
Y1 S-1 Major items, and major combinations pertaining to guided missile material
Y1 S-2 Major items, and major combinations pertaining to aerial target material
Y2 Body, guided missile, M2
Y3 Missile guided, Corporal, XSSM-A-17. (MGM-5 Corporal)
Y4
Y5 Launcher loader, guided missile, M26. and rack M5. (Nike (rocket))
Y6 Launcher control station M307. and launching central control, M3
Y7 Control indicator, CO-1448/MSE-2
Y8 Simulator group, OA-758/MSE-2
Y9 Rack battery charging M6. (Nike Ajax)
Y10 motor generator set, 400-cycle, (8003148)
Y11 Truck bracket hand, jato, M254, and missile M256. (Nike Ajax)
Y12 Truck bracket hand, guidance section, M255. (Nike Ajax)
Y13 Rail launching, and handling, XM1
Y14 Truck lift hand, missile, M257. (Nike Ajax)
Y15 shop set, assembly, and test. (special)
Y16 Carriage missile handling, XM28
Y17 Servicer, acid M2, and fuel M3, guided missile
Y18 test set launching area, portable electrical equipment, XM20
Y19 test set, electrical equipment, guided missile, XM22
Y20 tester missile hydraulic, XM14
Y21 Draining kit, oxidizer, guided missile, M53
Y22 Cable system fire control, M26, and launching M27
Y23
Y24
Y25
Y26 Tracking Station Group OS-1595/MPA-5;Missile Tracking Antenna-Receiver-Transmitter Group OA-1485/MPA; and Target Tracking Antenna-Receiver-Transmitter Group OA-1488/MPA: Addition of Waveguide Switch and Dummy Load (Nike Hercules Antiaircraft Guided Missile System) (U)
Y27
Y28 Director-Computer Group OA-1479/MSA-19: Burst Time Change (Nike Hercules Anti-Aircraft Guided Missile System) (U)
Y29
Y30
Y31
Y32 Target aerial, OQ-19B, and OQ-19D (Quail)
Y33 Launcher, rotary, aerial target, A-2
Y34 Catapult, aerial target, rocket powered, A-7
Y35 Starter, external electric, J-5
Y36 Cart universal starter, model RPES-3A
Y37 Test box equipment, aerial target
Y38 stand universal, model HS-2, and cradle target handling
Y39 Tracking Station Group OA-1595/MPA-5: Bore-sight Drift Reduction, Gain Control Increase, and System Reliability Improvement (Nike-Hercules Antiaircraft Guided Missile System)
Y40
Y41
Y42
Y43
Y44
Y45
Y46
Y47
Y48
Y49 Draining kit, fuel, guided missile, M54
Y50 Radar set group, semitrailer mounted, OA-652/MPO-25. (Corporal II)
Y51 Computer group, guided missile, trailer mounted, AN/MSA-6. (Corporal II)
Y52 Radio set, AN/MRQ-7, (Corporal II)
Y53 Control center, missile battery, AN/GTW-1. (Corporal II)
Y54 Selector, launcher control, AN/GSW-3. (Corporal II)
Y55 Firing station, guided missile, truck mounted, AN/MSM-1. (Corporal II)
Y56 Missile test station, truck mounted, AN/MSM-4. (Corporal II)
Y57
Y58 Antenna group, trailer mounted, OA-651/MPQ-25. (Corporal II)
Y59 Tracker optical, M3, (Corporal II)
Y60 Interconnecting group, cable, OA-771/G. (Corporal II)
Y61 Erector, guided missile, self-propelled M2. (Corporal II)
Y62 Trailer, warhead, guided missile, 4-wheel, M311. (Corporal II)
Y63 Air servicer, truck mounted, 5-ton 6x6, M350. (Corporal II)
Y64 Truck propellent servicing, 5-ton, 6x6, M268E1, (Corporal II)
Y65 Tank, acid, premetered, M1. (Corporal II)
Y66 Tank, Aniline, premetered, M2. (Corporal II)
Y67 Servicing platform, truck mounted, 5-ton, 6x6, M280E1. (Corporal II)
Y68 Launcher, guided missile, M27. (Corporal II)
Y69 Rack set, guided missile, M16, (Corporal II)
Y70 Control selector, type-C-1267/URW-6
Y71 Semitrailer, van, tracking station, M323. (Corporal II)
Y72
Y73
Y74
Y75
Y76
Y77
Y78
Y79
Y80
Y92 Group Y Field and Depot Maintenance Allowance for Radar Course Directing Central Common Items List Consisting of: Antenna and Mast Group; Antenna-Receiver-Transmitter Group, Acquisition; Antenna-Receiver-Transmitter Group, Missile Tracking; Antenna-Receiver-Transmitter Group, Target Tracking; Director-Computer Group; Electronic Shop, Trailer Mounted, M304; Tracking Station Group; Test Set, Radar TS-847A/MSW-1 (Nike-Hercules Antiaircraft Guided Missile System)
Y100 Field change kits for surface-to-surface guided missile systems
Y101 Field change kits for surface-to-air guided missile systems

Group "Z" material
Captured Foreign material
Z1 Major items and major combinations of German material
Z2 Major items and major combinations of Japanese material
Z3 German ammunition all types
Z4 Japanese ammunition all types

See also

Ammunition Identification Code
NATO Stock Number
United States Military Standard
List of individual weapons of the U.S. armed forces
List of World War II weapons of the United States
List of World War II artillery
Rock Island Arsenal
PS, The Preventive Maintenance Monthly
Table of Organization and Equipment
United States Army Ordnance Training and Heritage Center

Reference notes

References, general

ORD 1, (dated Feb. 1955)
ORD 12 SNL OGS 1 Obsolete Major Items of Group A (17 Jul 1945)
TM 9-1900 Ammunition general dated 1945
TM 9-2200 small arms, Mortars, antiaircraft guns.
TM 9-2300 Standard Artillery and Fire Control Material. dated 1944
TM 9-2300 Artillery Materiel and Associated Equipment. dated May 1949
Army Vehicle Identification Numbers by Dennis Spence, 
The Ordnance Department : procurement and supply"
Monthly catalog of United States Government publications #582, July 1943, 1705 pages (listed under War Department)
Nike Missiles Manuals Collection, 1951-1987 (archived) (in Group Y – GOGA 35286, Golden Gate National Recreation Area)

External links
Army Ordnance Association, October 6th 1922
U.S. Army Artillery Museum 

Weapons by supply catalog designation
Army
Army weapons by supply catalog designation
Army
Army
U.S. Army weapons
Army Weapons
Army Weapons
Army